Danijel Lončar (born 26 June 1997 in Versmold (Germany) is a Bosnian-Croatian professional footballer who plays as a centre-back for Polish club Pogoń Szczecin.

References

External links
 

1997 births
Living people
Sportspeople from Osijek
Association football defenders
Croatian footballers
NK Osijek players
Pogoń Szczecin players
Croatian Football League players
First Football League (Croatia) players

Croatian expatriate footballers
Expatriate footballers in Poland
Croatian expatriate sportspeople in Poland